Meishan (Sichuanese Pinyin: Mi2san1;), formerly known as Meizhou or Qingzhou, is a prefecture-level city with 2,955,219 inhabitants as of 2020 census whom 1,232,648 lived in the built-up (or metro) area made of the 2 urban districts of Dongpo and Pengshan. Its located in Sichuan province, China. Meishan is in the southwest of Sichuan Basin.

It belonged to Leshan Prefecture before 1997. Then Meishan Prefecture was founded in 1997 upon approval of state council. It was renamed Meishan City in 2000.

Administrative subdivisions 
It has 2 county-level district and 4 counties.

History

Notable people
Su Shi, Song Dynasty writer and poet (1037–1101), was a native of Meishan, and a historic temple commemorating him and his father and brother, also notable writers (the "three Su") is located in the city.
Yuan Chiung-chiung, Taiwanese author whose family originated in the area

Climate

References

External links

 
Cities in Sichuan
Prefecture-level divisions of Sichuan